John William Treadaway (26 June 1914 – 4 July 1993) was a British boxer who competed in the 1936 Summer Olympics.

He was born in Wandsworth and died in Sutton.

In 1936 he was eliminated in the quarterfinals of the featherweight class after losing his fight to the eventual bronze medalist Josef Miner.

1936 Olympic results
Below is the record of John Treadaway, a British featherweight boxer who competed at  the 1936 Berlin Olympics:

 Round of 32: defeated Giuseppe Farfanelli (Italy) on points
 Round of 16: defeated Arquimedes Arrieta (Uruguay) on points
 Quarterfinal: lost to Josef Miner (Germany) on points

External links
 profile
 John Treadaway's profile at Boxrec

1914 births
1993 deaths
Lightweight boxers
Featherweight boxers
Olympic boxers of Great Britain
Boxers at the 1936 Summer Olympics
English male boxers
Boxers from Greater London